The Welch's/Fry's Championship was a golf tournament for professional female golfers that was part of the LPGA Tour from 1981 to 2004. It was played at the Randolph Golf Course in Tucson, Arizona. From 1981 to 2002, it was played on the North Course and in 2003 and 2004 it was played on the Dell Urich Course.

It had several different title sponsors during its history. 

Tournament names through the years:
1981–1982: Arizona Copper Classic
1983: Tucson Conquistadores LPGA Open
1984: Tucson Conquistadores Open
1985–1987: Circle K Tucson Open
1988–1990: Circle K LPGA Tucson Open
1991–1996: Ping/Welch's Championship
1997–2002: Welch's/Circle K Championship
2003–2004: Welch's/Fry's Championship

The last tournament was held from March 11 through March 14, 2004.

Winners

Tournament record

See also
PING/Welch's Championship, another LPGA Tour event, played in Boston, Massachusetts (1993–1997).

External links
LPGA official tournament microsite

Former LPGA Tour events
Golf in Arizona
Women's sports in Arizona
Sports in Tucson, Arizona
Events in Tucson, Arizona
Recurring sporting events established in 1981
Recurring sporting events disestablished in 2004
1981 establishments in Arizona
2004 disestablishments in Arizona